Kokradi (Kokrady) is an agricultural village in Dakshina Kannada (South Canara district) of Karnataka State in India. Village population is predominantly engaged in arecanut farming. Administratively, it is under Andinje gram panchayat, Belthangadi Taluk, Dakshina Kannada. Kokradi is also used as a surname among the Billava, Chitrapur, Saraswat, and Brahmins from the village. Billava community constitutes the majority of the village population .

Demographics
The Indian Census of 2001 showed 235 households in Kokradi  with a total population of 1,167. In the 2011 census, the village recorded an increase of 153 persons or 1.4% a year. I

It has a Tulu speaking majority  Hindu population and some  Kannada and Konkani speakers(both Hindu and Catholic).

See also 
 Mangalore
 Saraswats
 Tulu

References 

Villages in Dakshina Kannada district